N'Dodjiga  is a commune of the Cercle of Youwarou in the Mopti Region of Mali. The commune contains about 50 small villages. The main village (chef-lieu) is Sah. In 2009 the commune had a population of 22,326.

References

Communes of Mopti Region